Larissa Pauluis (born 22 February 1980) is a Belgian Olympic dressage rider. She competed at two World Championships for Young Dressage Horses and competed at the Olympic Games in Tokyo, representing Belgium.

Equestrian career
Pauluis started riding at a young age and became Belgium National Champion in the pony class in 1996 and in 1997 in the juniors division. In 1998 she competed at the European Championships for Juniors in Hickstead. She trained several horses up to Grand Prix and competed at the World Championships for Young Dressage Horses in 2017 and 2019. Her international break-through came in 2021 by competing two horses on the highest level in Dressage. She competed at the Olympic Games, finished 42nd individually. For the first time since 1928 Belgium was represented by a dressage team at the Olympic Games.

References

External links
 
 
 
 

1980 births
Living people
Belgian female equestrians
Belgian dressage riders
Olympic equestrians of Belgium
Equestrians at the 2020 Summer Olympics
21st-century Belgian women